Bangoura (French spelling in Guinea) or "Bangura" (English spelling in Sierra Leone) is a typical Susu surname. Notable people with the surname include

Aboubacar Bangoura (disambiguation), several people
Alhassane Bangoura (born 1992), Guinean football player
Amara Bangoura (disambiguation), several people
Boubacar Bangoura (born 1990), Malian football player
Facinet Bangoura (born 1972), Guinean swimmer
Fodé Bangoura, Guinean politician
Ibrahima Bangoura (born 1982), Guinean football player
Ismaël Bangoura (born 1985), Guinean football player
Karim Bangoura ( – 1972), Guinean diplomat
Mahawa Bangoura, Guinean politician, first woman foreign minister
Momar Bangoura (born 1994), French football player
Ousmane Bangoura (born 1979), Guinean football player
Pathé Bangoura (born 1984), Guinean football player
Sambégou Bangoura (born 1982), Guinean football player
Seydouba Bangoura, Guinean football player